Sara Wheat (born June 27, 1984) is an American former competitive figure skater. She is the 1999 U.S. national junior champion, a three-time medalist on the ISU Junior Grand Prix circuit, and placed tenth at the 2001 World Junior Championships. Wheat was coached by Jeffrey DiGregorio and Pam Duane Gregory and represented the University of Delaware FSC.

Programs

Results

References

External links
 

American female single skaters
1984 births
Living people
University of Delaware people
Sportspeople from Trenton, New Jersey
21st-century American women